Tylototriton dabienicus is a species of salamander in the family Salamandridae from central China. It was formerly considered to be a subspecies of Tylotriton wenxianensis.

References

dabienicus